Rufus W. Gilbert (December 8, 1884 – 1962) was an American football, basketball, and baseball player and coach.  He served as the head football coach at Kalamazoo College (1905, 1907–1908), at Bradley Polytechnic Institute—now Bradley University (c. 1911), and at Rose Polytechnic Institute—now Rose-Hulman Institute of Technology (1915, 1917–1920).  Gilbert was also the head basketball coach at Rose Polytechnic from 1913 to 1921, tallying a mark of 39–67.  His son, Louis, played college football at the University of Michigan from 1925 to 1927.

Coaching career
Gilbert was the head football coach for the Kalamazoo Hornets located in Kalamazoo, Michigan.  He held that position for three seasons, first in 1905 and then again for 1907 and 1908.  His coaching record at Kalamazoo was 5–19–1.

See also
 List of college football head coaches with non-consecutive tenure

References

External links
 

1884 births
1962 deaths
Bradley Braves football coaches
Kalamazoo Hornets football coaches
Minor league baseball managers
Rose–Hulman Fightin' Engineers football coaches
Rose–Hulman Fightin' Engineers men's basketball coaches
Peoria Distillers players
Springfield Reapers players
Terre Haute Highlanders players
Terre Haute Terre-iers players
Zanesville Potters players